Jamil Al-Sufri (10 December 1921 – 4 March 2021) was a historian and teacher from Brunei who previously served as a member of the Royal Council, member of the Royal Succession Council, member of the Islamic Religious Council, and member of the Privy Council. He has also been referred to as the National Historian. He wrote works on the country's history, ancestry, customs and traditions, royal titles, Malay Islamic Monarchy (MIB), education, writings on Brunei heroes, and other topics.

Biography 
From 1 January 1939, through 31 December 1946, Jamil Al-Sufri worked as a Trainee Teacher for the Government of Brunei. After leaving the service, he was rehired and given the positions of Director of the Language Board of Brunei from 1961 until 1964, and Director of the Language and Literature Bureau (Dewan Bahasa dan Pustaka) from 1977 to 1981. Since the Brunei History Center's founding in 1982, he has served as its director till his death.  The late Pehin held a number of significant posts before Brunei achieved complete independence in 1984 and contributed to the development of Brunei. He also served on many councils, such as the Royal Succession Council (Majlis Mesyuarat Mengangkat Raja), and the Privy Council.

The idea of creating a Federation of Malaysia to unite Malaya, the colony of Singapore, and the three (British) Borneo regions was put out in 1961 by Tunku Abdul Rahman, the Prime Minister of Malaya. At first, everyone was on board with the concept, but Brunei and Singapore would later back out. It was during the meeting between then Sultan Omar Ali Saifuddien III and A.M. Azahari with Jamil Al-Sufri in presence. He firmly held his ground on accusing A.M. Azahari of being a liar.

Death 
At seven in the morning, the National Historian, who was 99 years old, passed away at Raja Isteri Pengiran Anak Saleha Hospital on 4 March 2021. At Kampong Mabohai in Bandar Seri Begawan, Sultan Hassanal Bolkiah paid his final respects to Jamil Al- Sufri on Wednesday morning of 4 March 2021. The funeral prayer was offered by the Sultan under the direction of Abdul Aziz Juned, the State Mufti.

Bibliography

Honours 
Jamil Al-Sufri was given the title of Yang Berhormat Pehin Jawatan Dalam Seri Maharaja, and earned the following honours; 
  Family Order of Seri Utama (DK) – Dato Seri Utama
  Order of Seri Paduka Mahkota Brunei Second Class (DPMB) – Dato Paduka
  Order of Paduka Seri Laila Jasa Second Class (DSLJ)  – Dato Seri Laila Jasa
  Omar Ali Saifuddin Medal (POAS)
  Sultan Hassanal Bolkiah Medal (PHBS)
  Armed Forces Service Medal (PBLI)
  Meritorious Service Medal (PJK)
  Long Service Medal (PKL)

References 

1921 births
2021 deaths

Bruneian Muslims

Bruneian historians